After the Ball: How America Will Conquer Its Fear and Hatred of Gays in the '90s is a 1989 book by neuropsychologist Marshall Kirk and advertising executive Hunter Madsen about LGBT rights in the United States. The book was expanded from a 1987 article by Kirk and Masen (who wrote under the pen-name "Erastes Pill") called "The Overhauling of Straight America", published in Guide magazine.

The book advocates a change in the national discourse in regards to gay and lesbian Americans in an effort to curb homophobia. A review in the Los Angeles Times called it "a stubbornly revisionist critique of the conventional wisdom of gay activism over the last two decades." Kirk and Madsen also call for the gay community to examine themselves.

Legal scholar Didi Herman writes that, despite being widely criticized and non-influential within lesbian and gay communities, the book has been strategically used by members of the Christian right as proof of a secretive "gay agenda" to subvert American Christianity and "traditional" definitions of the family.

References 

1980s LGBT literature
1989 non-fiction books
American non-fiction books
Books by Marshall Kirk
Doubleday (publisher) books
English-language books
LGBT literature in the United States
LGBT non-fiction books